Fatti Sentire (English: Speak Up)  (Hazte Sentir in Spanish) is the thirteenth studio album by Italian singer Laura Pausini, released on 16 March 2018 via Warner Music. The album is primarily in Italian and Spanish, but it also contains parts in Portuguese and English. At the 19th Annual Latin Grammy Awards, the Spanish-language version of the album (Hazte sentir) won the award for Best Traditional Pop Vocal Album.

The album was promoted by the Fatti Sentire World Tour. Since the shows in Rome were recorded to be released on video, on 20 November 2018 Laura Pausini released a duet version of the song Il coraggio di andare with italian singer Biagio Antonacci, serving as the sixth official single for the album, and to promote the re-issue of the album titled "Fatti Sentiré Ancora" "(Hazte Sentir Más - in Spanish)". The duet version of Il coraggio di andare was included in the re-issue of the album, which was released on 7 December 2018 release.

Track listing

Standard edition

Italian version

Spanish version 
All lyrics adapted in Spanish by Laura Pausini.

Re-issue 
The reissue of the Italian and Spanish-language editions, Fatti sentire ancora and Hazte sentir más, respectively, include new versions of some of the tracks which includes duets with artists, such as Simone & Simaria, Biagio Antonacci, Carlos Rivera and Gente de Zona, as well as their solo versions.

Italian version

Spanish version 
All lyrics adapted in Spanish by Laura Pausini.

Charts

Weekly charts

Year-end charts

Certifications

References

2018 albums
Italian-language albums
Latin Grammy Award for Best Traditional Pop Vocal Album
Laura Pausini albums
Portuguese-language albums
Spanish-language albums
Warner Music Group albums